Vodice is a town in the Šibenik-Knin County, Croatia. It borders the Adriatic Sea and has a population of 8,875 (2011 census).

History 
Vodice was first mentioned in 1402 although it was founded already in the Roman times as Arausa. Its name derives from the word meaning water sources which supplied the whole area. As part of the Republic of Venice from 1412 to 1797, the defense walls from the times of the Turks with the Coric tower testify the past times. Other similar monuments are St. Cross' church on the former graveyard, built in 1421 and the parish church in the town centre built in 1746.

On the nearby hill Okit during the Turkish invasions, refugees founded a settlement and on its top the chapel of Our Lady of Mount Carmel was built in 1660, which was ruined in 1942 by the Italian Navy. The new church, built in 1967, was ruined in 1991, during the Croatian War of Independence, and rebuilt in 1995.

Population

History of the Vodice fields 
Several kilometers north of Vodice there are two fields, Rakitnica and Gradelji/Pišća: Rakitnica has an old fort named Gradina on the hill and down the hill it has three wells and a pond, recently a Roman terracotta masonry has been excavated there. This field is most known for the small church of Saint John, damages from the Patriotic 1991-95 war can be sen, the grassland near it is known for having 1 May celebrations every year. Gradelji/Pišća has old walls on the top of the hill, an old Roman Cistern, the small church of Saint Eliah, and a small ruined house from the 17/18th century.

Culture and events
The most famous feast in Vodice called "Vodička fešta" is held on August 4 every year.
Well-known festival of Croatian pop music called "CMC festival" is held every year in June, featuring the most famous singers of Croatian pop music.

Notable residents
Vodice is birthplace of famous Croatian playwright Ivo Brešan.

Image gallery

See also
 Šibenik
 Island Prvić
 Kornati National Park
 Krka National Park
 Adriatic Boat Show

References

External links 

 Official site
 Travel Guide
 Photo Gallery

Cities and towns in Croatia
Populated coastal places in Croatia
Populated places in Šibenik-Knin County